Michael J. Norris (born April 12, 1976) is the Assembly member for the 144th District of the New York State Assembly. He is a Republican. The district includes portions of Erie, Niagara and Orleans counties in Western New York.

Life and career
Norris was born and raised in Lockport, New York and attended Lockport High School. He is a graduate of Niagara University and Albany Law School. He was admitted to the New York State Bar in 2006. As an attorney, Norris has focused on real estate, contracts and estate planning. He has served as the attorney for numerous towns in Niagara County, as well as a town prosecutor.

A former aide for both the New York State Assembly, and the New York Senate, he has also been politically engaged as an elections commissioner.

New York State Assembly
In 2016, Assemblywoman Jane Corwin announced that she would not seek re-election after four terms. The 144th district, a reliably Republican district, had its three counties, Erie, Niagara and Orleans choosing Norris to replace her through their county Republican organizations.  He was unopposed for the Republican nomination, as well as for the general election.

Norris was sworn into office on January 1, 2017.

References
http://niagarafallsreporter.com/indicted.html Norris Granted Immunity

External links
New York State Assemblyman Michael J. Norris official site

Living people
Politicians from Lockport, New York
Niagara University alumni
Albany Law School alumni
Republican Party members of the New York State Assembly
21st-century American politicians
1976 births